Ingo Lesser is an East German and later German former ski jumper.

References

Living people
German male ski jumpers
Universiade medalists in ski jumping
Year of birth missing (living people)
Universiade bronze medalists for East Germany
Competitors at the 1985 Winter Universiade
Competitors at the 1987 Winter Universiade